Dummy Taylor (26 August 1913 – 27 May 2002) was a South African cricketer. He played in three first-class matches for Border in 1947/48.

See also
 List of Border representative cricketers

References

External links
 

1913 births
2002 deaths
South African cricketers
Border cricketers
People from Worcester, South Africa
Cricketers from the Western Cape